Allison Ikley-Freeman is an American politician who served as a member of the Oklahoma Senate from 2018 to 2021. She was elected to the Senate in a special election on November 14, 2017. A member of the Democratic Party, she represented the 37th district.

Background 
Ikley-Freeman earned a bachelor's degree in psychology and a master's degree in clinical mental health. Prior to her election to the Oklahoma Senate, she worked as a mental health counsellor.

References

External links
 Campaign website

Living people
Lesbian politicians
Democratic Party Oklahoma state senators
Women state legislators in Oklahoma
LGBT state legislators in Oklahoma
21st-century American politicians
Politicians from Tulsa, Oklahoma
Year of birth missing (living people)
21st-century American women politicians
21st-century LGBT people